Boren is a surname of German origin. Notable people with the surname include:

Allen Boren (born 1934), American college football coach
Carson Boren (1824–1912), one of the founders of Seattle, Washington; first sheriff of King County, Washington
Dan Boren (born 1973), American politician from Oklahoma; U.S. representative since 2005
David Boren (born 1941), American politician from Oklahoma; U.S. senator 1979–94
Henry C. Boren (1921–2013), American historian and author
James Boren (1925–2010), American humorist and writer 
Justin Boren (born 1988), American football offensive guard
Lyle Boren (1909–1992), American politician from Oklahoma; U.S. representative 1937–47
Mae Boren Axton (1914–1997), American composer 
Mike Boren (contemporary), American college football player at the University of Michigan
Murray Boren (born 1950), composer of opera, symphonic, chamber, and vocal works
Wen Boren (ca. 1502–75), Chinese landscape painter 
Zach Boren, American football player